Exclusion may refer to:

Legal or regulatory
 Exclusion zone, a geographic area in which some sanctioning authority prohibits specific activities
 Exclusion Crisis and Exclusion Bill, a 17th-century attempt to ensure a Protestant succession in England
 Exclusionary rule, a US legal principle

Other uses
 Social exclusion, state of being socially disadvantaged, marginalized, relegated to the fringe of society, or banished
 Diagnosis of exclusion, medical diagnosis by the process of elimination 
 Expulsion (education), permanent exclusion (i.e., permanent suspension) from a school or university, usually punitively
 Clusivity, a linguistic concept
 Exclusion (film), a 2014 Indian drama film

See also
 Outcast (person)
 Transclusion, the inclusion of part or all of an electronic document into one or more other documents by hypertext reference